Grass Lake Township may refer to:

 Grass Lake Charter Township, Michigan
 Grass Lake Township, Kanabec County, Minnesota
 Grass Lake Township, Burleigh County, North Dakota, in Burleigh County, North Dakota

Township name disambiguation pages